Stone Creek is a tributary of Holland Brook in Hunterdon County, New Jersey in the United States.

Stone Creek is positioned to the left of Holland Brook facing downstream. It is the first tributary of the Brook in the western section of Readington Township near Cushetunk Mountain. Stony Creek Lane, just east of the stream is named after the waterway. The creek is named for its stony bottom resultant of rock from Mount Cushetunk. The brook is categorized by the NJDEP's website as FW2-NT (fresh water second level classification generally not suitable for trout.)

See also
List of rivers of New Jersey

Rivers of Hunterdon County, New Jersey
Tributaries of the Raritan River
Rivers of New Jersey
Readington Township, New Jersey